Nadia Delago (born 12 November 1997) is an Italian World Cup alpine ski racer.

She is the sister of Nicol Delago.

Family
Four Alpine skiers from the Delago family have participated in World Cup and World Championships competitions. Siblings Oskar (born 1963) and Karla Delago (born 1965), specialists in speed events in the 1980s and their two nieces, Nicol (born 1996) and Nadia (born 1997), active in the 2010s.

World Championship results

Olympic results

References

External links
 

1997 births
Living people
Italian female alpine skiers
Sportspeople from Brixen
Alpine skiers at the 2022 Winter Olympics
Olympic alpine skiers of Italy
Medalists at the 2022 Winter Olympics
Olympic medalists in alpine skiing
Olympic bronze medalists for Italy